MuchOnDemand (also called MOD) is an hour-long per broadcast viewer interactive television program aired on MuchMusic, Monday through Friday at 5pm ET. It was broadcast live from 299 Queen Street West in Toronto, Ontario. The Best of MuchOnDemand, aired Sundays at 10am ET, highlighting the best moments on the show from the past week. MuchOnDemand acted as MuchMusic's flagship show in a similar manner as MTV's U.S. music video countdown show Total Request Live.

History

MuchOnDemand first aired with VJ host Rick Campanelli, mainly with a format where people can request videos.  When it changed its format in 2002, it added Jennifer Hollett as co-host. Since its debut, the show has been hosted by several other personalities, including Amanda Walsh (who replaced Jennifer Hollett), Sarah Taylor and Devon Soltendieck and Matte Babel and Leah Miller since 2004. In 2006, Tim Deegan began co-hosting regularly.

The usual hosts until the show's end were Sarah Taylor, Devon Soltendieck, Jesse Giddings, Tim Deegan and Liz Trinnear.

Leah Miller, host on the show, had her last day on Monday, August 31, 2009, where she left MuchOnDemand to move to Los Angeles and become regular host of So You Think You Can Dance Canada.

June 18, 2010, the Friday prior to the MuchMusic Video Awards, was apparently the last day for MuchOnDemand to be aired, since no mention was ever made on the show that the show was going away. In MOD's time slot come Monday was simply an hour of music videos, there was no post-MMVA coverage, and MuchOnDemand had vanished. CTVglobemedia had apparently started some massive renovations to the 299 Queen Street West building, rumoured to equip CTV/Much with HD capabilities, which prevented all VJ-hosted show, including VideoFlow and MuchNews, from being produced, and that the studio would be ready to go again in December. These renovations also changed the face of CTV's entertainment newsmagazine, etalk, as their studio was a close neighbour to the Much studio. But while etalk lost their studio too, they were able to relocate their on-air locale to their newsroom, as the whole Queen Street building is wired as an on-air studio.

On August 23, 2010, Sarah Taylor confirmed via her Twitter account that MuchOnDemand was not coming back and that a "new show is on  way". On December 13, 2010, New.Music.Live., the successor to MOD, premiered at its regular timeslot.

Show components
MuchOnDemand combined a variety of music and entertainment related aspects, including music videos, entertainment news, a live audience and viewer interaction.

Music videos
MuchOnDemand had a daily countdown called the Daily Ten, which was a viewer voted daily countdown similar to MTV's TRL and 106 & Park'''s countdown. In May 2007, MuchOnDemand relaunched with a new logo and images, and included a "Daily Ten" list similar to the one on TRL, but with a different process of voting. This was a change from the previous "VOTE-O-MATIC" polls they used to feature.

"Daily Ten" has been discontinued in favour of a "Daily 5" presentation.

In 2010, MuchMusic made Fridays on MOD "All Request Friday".

In early May 2010 the "Daily 5" was discontinued and replaced by video requests from fans of the show.

News
The MuchNews component of the program, reports on recent entertainment news. The segment normally airs 30 minutes into the program. The MuchNews segment was formerly hosted by Hannah Sung and is now hosted by VJ Devon Soltendieck, VJ Tim Deegan or VJ Sarah Taylor.  MuchMusic also airs a segment of MuchNews as a 'MuchNews Minute' for exactly a minute during commercials on the channel and 'MuchNews Weekly' which highlights the week's top news headlines. MuchNews Weekly'' is usually aired at the end of a week or at the beginning of the following week.

Live interviews and artist performances
The show invites many popular Canadian and international artists for interviews and live performances during certain shows. The show features celebrity guests, from actors to music artists and groups, and even athletes and politicians. Invitees in the studio should get their passes beforehand to be able to attend. Audiences are encouraged to take an active part in direct questions in the studio, and others pose their queries via direct links or internet and phone or in video-taped and e-mailed questions.

These shows with renowned or emerging new artists attract big fan following, with some crowds waiting outside the MOD studios on both corners of the building watching the events from outside through open windows that overlook the studio. The guests make a point of visiting briefly the crowds outside who are there without invitation passes and at times in very harsh weather conditions (snow, rain or heat) and answering fan questions from them and signing autographs.

Gossip
The U.S. media personality Perez Hilton is featured regularly giving latest entertainment and gossip news. He uses the segment at times to air exclusive recent news items from his own perspective and to express personal opinions about general media culture.

Earlier features

In 2005, new features were included on MOD. "Blog Blab" is a look inside the internet celeb blogs. "Quote of the Day" is a quote featured daily by a celebrity, which the announcer usually has a tendency to make fun of. The "Much Poll", which VJ Sarah Taylor calls "Poll-Dancing", asked a question or asks for an opinion, and viewers vote for their favourite answer. At the end of the show, the winning answer is announced. In 2007, the feature was removed.

In 2006, the "Much Quiz" was introduced to the show. Every Thursday, viewers are presented with four questions about themselves, appearing on screen before commercial break. Viewers can text message their answers to MuchMusic, getting their results sent back at the end of the show, or keep track with a pen and paper. They have now removed the Much Quiz.

In 2007, the "Show Me Yours" addition to the show was added. Viewers send in their request on Video via cellphones, webcams, etc. and send it to the "Show Me Yours" part of the MuchMusic website where VJ's would play them and have their requests done.

See also
 Total Request Live (MTV Live Video Countdown Show)

External links
 

1997 Canadian television series debuts
2010 Canadian television series endings
Much (TV channel) original programming
Television shows filmed in Toronto
1990s Canadian music television series
2000s Canadian music television series
2010s Canadian music television series